Miguel Pérez Cevallos (died 2 October 1681) was a Roman Catholic prelate who served as Auxiliary Bishop of Toledo (1660–1681).

Biography
On 21 January 1660, Miguel Pérez Cevallos, he was appointed during the papacy of Pope Alexander VII as Auxiliary Bishop of Toledo and Titular Bishop of Arcadiopolis in Asia. On 3 October 1660, he was consecrated bishop. He served as Auxiliary Bishop of Toledo until his death on 2 October 1681.

Episcopal succession

References 

17th-century Roman Catholic bishops in Spain
Bishops appointed by Pope Alexander VII
1681 deaths